Idaho Legislative District 21 is one of 35 districts of the Idaho Legislature. It is currently represented by Regina Bayer (Republican), Steven Harris, (Republican), and Megan Kiska (Republican).

District profile (1984–1992) 
From 1984 to 1992, District 21 was a floterial district that contained Districts 14, 15, 16, 17, 18, 19, and 20. District 21 consisted of all of Ada County.

District profile (1992–2002) 
From 1992 to 2002, District 21 consisted of Blaine, Camas, Lincoln Counties a portion of Elmore and Gooding Counties.

District profile (2002–2012) 
From 2002 to 2012, District 21 consisted of a portion of Ada County.

District profile (2012–2022) 
District 21 currently consists of a portion of Ada County.

See also

 List of Idaho Senators
 List of Idaho State Representatives

References

External links
Idaho Legislative District Map (with members)
Idaho Legislature (official site)

21
Ada County, Idaho